John Vinci (born February 6, 1937) is a Chicago-based American architect who works on architectural preservation of historic buildings in addition to new designs.

He is noted for the rehabilitation of many noted landmarks including Frank Lloyd Wright’s studio in Oak Park, Illinois, Louis Sullivan’s Carson Pirie Scott department store and the reconstruction of the Adler and Sullivan Stock Exchange Trading Room inside the Art Institute of Chicago.

Early life, education and career 

John Vinci was born on February 6, 1937, in Chicago, Illinois to Italian immigrants Nicholas Vinci and his wife, Nicoline and is the youngest of Nicholas' seven children.  He received a Bachelor of Architecture from the Illinois Institute of Technology in 1960 and began his architectural career at Skidmore, Owings & Merrill in Chicago before moving to Brenner Danforth Rockwell Architects. He has since headed his own firms, including Vinci/Kenny Architects (1969-1979), and the Office of John Vinci, Inc. (1980-1995).  He is currently partnered with Philip Hamp in Vinci | Hamp Architects (VHA)

In addition to his architectural work, Mr. Vinci has extensive experience in the design of art exhibition installations at the Art Institute of Chicago and other museums.  Mr. Vinci has also been an instructor of the history of nineteenth and twentieth century architecture at the Illinois Institute of Technology (1972-1992) (2000), and at Roosevelt University (1970-1972).  He has written or contributed to architectural books and publications most notably The Complete Architecture of Adler and Sullivan, (Aaron Siskind and Richard Nickel with John Vinci and Ward Miller, 2011, Published by The Richard Nickel Committee).

Select Restoration Work 
 Frank Lloyd Wright's Studio in Oak Park, Illinois
 Louis Sullivan’s Carson Pirie Scott department store
 The exterior masonry of H.H. Richardson's John J. Glessner House
 The Art Institute of Chicago's Grand Stair and Lobby
 The reconstruction of the Adler and Sullivan Chicago Stock Exchange Trading Room inside the Art Institute of Chicago.

Select new designs 
 South Kenwood Residence (2001)
 The Arts Club of Chicago (1997)
 The National Italian American Sports Hall of Fame (2000)
 The Manilow Residence., with Max Gordon (1991)

Select Awards 

 AIA, Chicago Chapter, Lifetime Achievement Award, 2014
 Named Legendary Landmark, 2011,  Landmark Illinois
 AIA, Chicago Chapter: Honor Award for restoration of Hyde Park Historical Society (former Chicago Street Railway Company) Building, 1981
 AIA, Chicago Chapter: Honor Award for restoration of the Trading Room, Art Institute of Chicago, 1980
 AIA, Chicago Chapter: Honor Award for restoration of Carson, Pirie, Scott & Co. Department Store, 1980

References

Further reading 
Sharoff, Rober and Zbaren, William: John Vinci: Life and Landmarks, Northwestern University Press, 2017

External links 
 Vinci | Hamp Architects
 Oral history of John Vinc i / interviewed by Betty J. Blum, compiled under the auspices of the Chicago Architects Oral History Project, the Ernest R. Graham Study Center for Architectural Drawings, Department of Architecture, the Art Institute of Chicago.

1937 births
Living people
Architects from Chicago
Illinois Institute of Technology alumni
American people of Italian descent